Eberhard Konrad Roman Vogdt ( in Kohatu, Governorate of Estonia – 9 February 1964 in Oberaula, West Germany) was an Estonian sailor who competed in the 1928 Summer Olympics.

In 1928 he was a crew member of the Estonian boat Tutti V which won the bronze medal in the 6 metre class.

External links
profile

1902 births
1964 deaths
People from Märjamaa Parish
People from the Governorate of Estonia
Estonian male sailors (sport)
Olympic sailors of Estonia
Sailors at the 1928 Summer Olympics – 6 Metre
Olympic bronze medalists for Estonia
Olympic medalists in sailing
Medalists at the 1928 Summer Olympics